Rutebåten Utsira AS is a company that operates the ferry MS Utsira from Haugesund to Utsira, Norway. The company is owned by the Municipality of Utsira who took over operations in 1978. The current ferry was delivered in 2005; the crossing takes 70 minutes with four round trips per day on contract with Kolumbus.

References

Ferry companies of Rogaland
Shipping companies of Norway
Companies based in Rogaland
Transport companies established in 1978
1978 establishments in Norway
Companies owned by municipalities of Norway
Utsira